Thaiderces is a genus of spiders from Southeast Asia in the family Psilodercidae, first described in 2017.

Species 
 it contains eighteen species:

 Thaiderces chujiao Li & Chang, 2019 – Thailand
 Thaiderces djojosudharmoi (Deeleman-Reinhold, 1995) – Indonesia
 Thaiderces fengniao Li & Chang, 2019 – Thailand
 Thaiderces ganlan Li & Chang, 2019 – Myanmar
 Thaiderces haima Li & Chang, 2019 – Thailand
 Thaiderces jian F. Y. Li & S. Q. Li, 2017 – Thailand
 Thaiderces jiazi Li & Chang, 2019 – Thailand
 Thaiderces miantiao Li & Chang, 2019 – Thailand
 Thaiderces ngalauindahensis Li & Chang, 2019 – Indonesia
 Thaiderces peterjaegeri Li & Chang, 2019 – Thailand
 Thaiderces rimbu (Deeleman-Reinhold, 1995) – Indonesia
 Thaiderces shuzi Li & Chang, 2019 – Thailand
 Thaiderces thamphadaengensis Li & Chang, 2019 – Thailand
 Thaiderces thamphrikensis Li & Chang, 2019 – Thailand
 Thaiderces tuoyuan Li & Chang, 2019 – Thailand
 Thaiderces vulgaris (Deeleman-Reinhold, 1995) – Thailand
 Thaiderces yangcong Li & Chang, 2019 – Indonesia
 Thaiderces zuichun Li & Chang, 2019 – Thailand

References

Psilodercidae
Araneomorphae genera